Mark Dickinson  (born 7 July 1999) is a British amateur boxer who is affiliated with Birtley ABC. In 2017 he won gold medals at the European Youth Championships and Commonwealth Youth Games.

In May 2019, Dickinson was selected to compete at the 2019 European Games in Minsk, Belarus. He also competed at the 2019 World Championships in Yekaterinburg, Russia, where he lost by unanimous decision to Arman Darchinyan in the first round.

References

1999 births
Living people
British male boxers
European Games competitors for Great Britain
Boxers at the 2019 European Games
Middleweight boxers